Curzon Cinema could refer to:

 The Curzon Community Cinema, Clevedon, a historically significant cinema in western England
 The (unrelated) Curzon Cinemas cinema chain, specialising in arthouse films